Yllenus is a genus of jumping spiders that was first described by Eugène Louis Simon in 1868. Until 2019, it was considered a senior synonym of Pseudomogrus, and many of the species formerly placed here were transferred to new genera Logunyllus and Marusyllus by Jerzy Prószyński in 2016.

Y. arenarius is peculiar in building silken nests under the sand surface of sandy dunes it inhabits.

Species
 it contains eighteen species, found from central Europe to China:
Yllenus arenarius Simon, 1868 (type) – Central, Eastern Europe
Yllenus baltistanus Caporiacco, 1935 – India
Yllenus charynensis Logunov & Marusik, 2003 – Kazakhstan
Yllenus desertus Wesolowska, 1991 – Mongolia
Yllenus dunini Logunov & Marusik, 2003 – Azerbaijan, Kazakhstan
Yllenus erzinensis Logunov & Marusik, 2003 – Russia, Mongolia
Yllenus flavociliatus Simon, 1895 – Russia, Central Asia, Mongolia, China
Yllenus gajdosi Logunov & Marusik, 2000 – Mongolia
Yllenus horvathi Chyzer, 1891 – Hungary, Bulgaria, Romania, Ukraine
Yllenus karakumensis Logunov & Marusik, 2003 – Turkmenistan
Yllenus kononenkoi Logunov & Marusik, 2003 – Kyrgyzstan
Yllenus kulczynskii Punda, 1975 – Mongolia
Yllenus lyachovi Logunov & Marusik, 2000 – Russia (Europe), Kazakhstan
Yllenus marusiki Logunov, 1993 – Mongolia
Yllenus rotundiorificus Logunov & Marusik, 2000 – Mongolia
Yllenus turkestanicus Logunov & Marusik, 2003 – Central Asia
Yllenus uiguricus Logunov & Marusik, 2003 – Kazakhstan
Yllenus zyuzini Logunov & Marusik, 2003 – Russia (Caucasus), Kazakhstan, Turkmenistan

References

External links
 Photograph of Y. univittatus

Salticidae
Salticidae genera
Spiders of Asia